The Polish Academy Award for Best Production Design is an annual award given to the best Polish film production design of the year.

Winners and nominees

References

External links
 Polish Film Awards: official website 

Polish film awards
Awards established in 1999
1999 establishments in Poland